Isconahua or Iscobaquebo is an indigenous American language of the Panoan family. It is spoken by the Isconahua tribe in Peru. The Isconahua is a very isolated tribe and has very little contact with the outside world.
As of 2000, there were 82 speakers.

It has an official alphabet approved by the Ministry of Education of Peru.

References 

Panoan languages
Languages of Peru